Cornell Companies (NYSE:CRN) was an American corporation that operated correctional facilities, contracting them to state and local governments. The company's headquarters were located in Houston, Texas. On August 12, 2010, Cornell was acquired by the GEO Group.

History 
Cornell Companies, through predecessor entities, began operations of juvenile facilities in 1973, adult-community-based programs in 1974, and adult secure facilities in 1984. In 1996, Cornell Companies was officially incorporated in the State of Delaware as a consolidated entity. By 2010, Cornell had established long-standing relationships with a number of significant federal and state customers, including a nearly 20-year relationship with the Bureau of Prisons in its Adult Secure division and a 35-year relationship with the Bureau of Prisons in its Adult Community-Based division. Also, in Cornell's Abraxas juvenile division, more than 70% of revenue was sourced from customers over 15+ years. Cornell had significant contracts with the Departments of Corrections in the states of Alaska, California, Colorado, Mississippi and Arizona.

Business segments 
Cornell Companies offered a diverse portfolio of services in structured and secure environments through three operating divisions:

 Adult Secure Services
 Adult Community-Based Services
 Abraxas Youth and Family Services

Within the Adult Secure Services segment, Cornell provided minimum- to maximum-security incarceration services for federal, state and local government agencies.

Cornell's Adult Community-Based Services involved the supervision of adult parolees and probationers. Cornell offered a national presence with locations in many large urban areas, throughout the United States. Cornell was a leading provider of community-based services to the U.S. Federal Bureau of Prisons and to a number of state corrections departments.

The Abraxas Youth & Family Services division included residential, detention, shelter care and community-based services, along with educational, rehabilitation and treatment programs for juveniles, typically between the ages of 10 and 18.

Employees 
At December 31, 2008, Cornell had 4,109 full-time employees and 300 part-time employees. Cornell employs management, administrative and clerical, security, educational and counselling services, health services and general maintenance personnel.

Controversies

Frank Prewitt, Cornell's consultant in Alaska, acknowledged making a prohibited campaign contribution in 2002 that was actually from Cornell. It could have resulted in a civil fine or written warning if the violation had come to the attention of the Alaska Public Offices Commission. The issue was moot because fines or warnings for Alaska campaign contribution violations can only be issued within twelve months of the alleged violation (Alaska Statutes 15.56.130). Cornell Alaska partner Bill Weimar subsequently pleaded guilty to two counts of corruption and was sentenced to federal prison.

Cornell Corrections was awarded a Mississippi state contract to operate the Walnut Grove Correctional Facility (WGCF) in September 2003. The number of prisoners at the facility increased but Cornell did not adjust staffing appropriately. A state audit in 2005 showed the guard to prisoner ratio was 1 to 60, which was believed to contribute to the rate of violence and abuses. According to the Council for Juvenile Correctional Administrators, a ratio of 1 to 10 or 12 is more common. In addition, prisoners were ageing; by 2006 prisoners up to age 21 were housed there. Older prisoners in their early 20s were added during expansion of the capacity. These changes made conditions more harsh for younger inmates. As of 2006 the prison housed 950 prisoners ages 12 to 21. The 200 prison guard jobs helped employ townspeople who had been laid off by closure of a local garment manufacturing plant. Walnut Grove received payment in lieu of taxes from the prison corporation, monies that made up 15% of its annual budget. William Grady Sims, mayor of Walnut Grove since 1981, profited from the revenues of 18 vending machines he had installed at the WGCF. By 2009, the prison had 1,225 prisoners. Its prisoner base had aged, and the state had also assigned older prisoners there, endangering younger inmates. Cornell Companies operated the prison until August 12, 2010, when Cornell was bought by GEO Group. In November 2010, plaintiffs represented by the Southern Poverty Law Center and the ACLU National Prison Project filed a federal class-action lawsuit against GEO and the state agencies that contracted for the facility, saying that the prison authorities allowed abuses and negligence to occur at the facility. The lawsuit stated that prison guards engaged in sexual intercourse with the prisoners, tolerated and encouraged violence, smuggled illegal drugs into the facilities, and that prison authorities denied required education and sufficient medical care. As of that month the prison had about 1,200 prisoners ages 13–22; the lawsuit said that half of the prisoners were incarcerated for nonviolent offenses. Weeks prior to the filing of the lawsuit, United States Department of Justice officials informed Governor of Mississippi Haley Barbour that the department had started an investigation concerning the prison. In addition to learning about prisoner abuses, investigators found that prison officials were being paid bonuses from federal funds for "administering" education in the prison. That was reviewed separately by the Office of the Inspector General at the US Department of Education.

References

External links

GEO Group web site
"Larger Inmate Population Is Boon To Private Prisons", Wall Street Journal 
"Growth in the Total Correctional Population During 2008 was the Slowest in Eight Years", Bureau of Justice Statistics, US Department of Justice

Private prisons in the United States
Companies disestablished in 2010
GEO Group